Halpern is a variation of the Jewish surname Heilprin and may refer to:

 Baruch Halpern, Jewish studies
 Benjamin Halpern, American marine biologist and ecologist
 Carolyn Halpern, American psychologist
 Charles Halpern, lawyer
 Charna Halpern, co–founder of ImprovOlympic
 Cheryl Halpern, chair of the Corporation for Public Broadcasting
 David Halpern (canoeist), (b. 1955), sprint canoer
 Diane F. Halpern, American psychologist
 Ida Halpern, (1910–1987), Austrian musicologist
 Jack Halpern (chemist), (1925–2018), Polish chemist
 Jack Halpern (linguist), lexicographer
 Jake Halpern, (b. 1975), American author
 Jeff Halpern, (b. 1976), American ice hockey player
 Joseph Halpern, computer science professor
 Justin Halpern, (b. 1980), American author
 Lily Halpern, American singer
 Mitch Halpern, (1967–2000), boxing referee
 Mortimer Halpern, (1909–2006), American Broadway stage manager
 Moyshe Leyb Halpern, (1886–1932), American Yiddish poet
 Paul Halpern, (b. 1961), American science writer and physicist
 Ralph Halpern (born 1938), Austrian-born British businessman
 Steven Halpern, American new age musician
 Yisroel Halpern (aka Yisroel Karduner), (d. 1920), rabbi and Breslover Hasid

See also 

 Mr. Halpern and Mr. Johnson, a 1983 TV movie
 Halpern v. Canada (Attorney General), a landmark Canadian legal case which legalized same–sex marriage
 Halperin (surname)

Jewish surnames
Yiddish-language surnames
German toponymic surnames